Pike Township is one of the twenty-two townships of Knox County, Ohio, United States.  The 2010 census found 1,532 people in the township.

Geography
Located in the northern part of the county, it borders the following townships:
Worthington Township, Richland County - north
Brown Township - east
Howard Township - southeast corner
Monroe Township - south
Morris Township - southwest
Berlin Township - west
Jefferson Township, Richland County - northwest corner

No municipalities are located in Pike Township.

Name and history
Pike Township was established in 1819. It is named for General Zebulon Pike.

It is one of eight Pike Townships statewide.

Government
The township is governed by a three-member board of trustees, who are elected in November of odd-numbered years to a four-year term beginning on the following January 1. Two are elected in the year after the presidential election and one is elected in the year before it. There is also an elected township fiscal officer, who serves a four-year term beginning on April 1 of the year after the election, which is held in November of the year before the presidential election. Vacancies in the fiscal officership or on the board of trustees are filled by the remaining trustees.

References

External links
County website

Townships in Knox County, Ohio
Townships in Ohio
1819 establishments in Ohio
Populated places established in 1819